Joana Maria Jaciara da Silva Neves Euzébio (born 14 February 1987) is a Paralympic swimmer from Brazil. She competed at the 2012, 2016, and 2020 Paralympics and won two silver and three bronze medals. In 2015, she became the first Brazilian woman to win an individual gold medal at the IPC World Championships, which she has done in the 50 m freestyle.

References

External links 

 

Paralympic swimmers of Brazil
1987 births
Living people
Swimmers at the 2012 Summer Paralympics
Swimmers at the 2016 Summer Paralympics
Swimmers at the 2020 Summer Paralympics
Medalists at the 2012 Summer Paralympics
Medalists at the 2016 Summer Paralympics
Medalists at the 2020 Summer Paralympics
Paralympic silver medalists for Brazil
Paralympic bronze medalists for Brazil
S5-classified Paralympic swimmers
Brazilian female butterfly swimmers
Brazilian female freestyle swimmers
Medalists at the World Para Swimming Championships
Paralympic medalists in swimming
21st-century Brazilian women